The cabinet of Prime Minister Miloš Zeman was in power from 22 July 1998 to 15 July 2002. It was a minority government of Czech Social Democratic Party. The government was supported by Civic Democratic Party as a result of Opposition Agreement.

Government ministers

References

Czech government cabinets
Czech Social Democratic Party
Miloš Zeman